ABC News, or ABC News and Current Affairs, is a public news service produced by the Australian Broadcasting Corporation. Broadcasting within Australia and the rest of the world, the service covers both local and world affairs.

The division of the organisation, which is called ABC News, Analysis and Investigations. is responsible for all news-gathering and coverage across the Australian Broadcasting Corporation's various television, radio, and online platforms. Some of the services included under the auspices of the division are the ABC News TV channel (formerly ABC News 24); the long-running radio news programs, AM, The World Today, and PM; ABC NewsRadio, a 24-hour continuous news radio channel; and radio news bulletins and programs on ABC Local Radio, ABC Radio National, ABC Classic FM, and Triple J.

ABC News Online has an extensive online presence which includes many written news reports and videos available via ABC Online, an ABC News mobile app (ABC Listen), podcasts, and in addition, all of the ABC news television programs available via the video-on-demand platform, ABC iview. , the ABC News website includes ABC Sport, ABC Health, ABC Science, ABC Arts & Culture, ABC Fact Check, ABC Environment, and news in other languages.

Justin Stevens was appointed director of the division on 31 March 2022.

History
From its inception in 1932, ABC radio sourced its news from many sources, including cable news from London, its own bureaus in Europe, the Middle East, Greece and the Asia-Pacific, and in a fashion similar to commercial radio stations from local newspapers around Australia. 

Censorship was rife during the war, particularly after the U.S. entered the conflict on 7 December 1941. After General Douglas MacArthur set up his headquarters in Australia, he wielded enormous power, including on matters of censorship. Inter alia, he declared that every Australian radio station would only broadcast three news bulletins per day and that these would be simultaneous on all stations (ABC and commercial) at 7.45 am, midday and 7.00 pm. Weather forecasts were banned because it was felt that these may assist the enemy. 

The 7.45 am bulletin was the only one that did not commence on the hour or the half-hour. Incredibly, this 7.45 bulletin continued to be heard on ABC Local Radio stations until as late as 19 September 2020.  Therefore, it would not be unreasonable to suggest that the effects of war-time censorship were still felt in Australia until 2020.

Notices were issued banning radio stations from broadcasting some major wartime events, but as the federal government didn't have the same power over the printed press as it did over radio, newspapers usually reported events that radio was not permitted to mention.

The ABC launched its first independent news bulletin on 1 June 1947 after years of negotiations with the Australian Government.

The Australian Broadcasting Corporation Act 1983 mandates that the ABC "shall develop and maintain an independent service for the broadcasting of news and information" both within Australia on a daily basis, and also to countries outside Australia.

The name of the division and director responsible has changed over the years. In 2004 it was the News and Current Affairs Division, when John Cameron took over as Director from Max Uechtritz as Director.  The financial year 2008–2009 saw a lot of changes, both in the way that television content was produced as well as an "expansion of international news programming and continuous news across platforms, new programs and a range of appointments to senior positions". Kate Torney became director of the News Division in April 2009.

There were several programming changes, with regional and local programming losing out to national programs, and the Adelaide TV production studio had to close apart from news and current affairs section.

In late 2015 Gaven Morris was appointed Director of the News Division.

In November 2016 it was announced that ABC NewsRadio and ABC News 24 rebranded as ABC News on 10 April 2017. The ABC announced on that day that ABC News 24 and ABC NewsRadio were both called ABC NEWS, with a new logo and visual branding. They would be distinguished by context or by descriptors, such as "the ABC News channel" for TV and "ABC News on radio" for radio. Social media accounts would be merged.

The Director's role changed its name to Director, News, Analysis & Investigations in 2017–2018, and  Morris is still in the role. During the 2017 to 2018 financial year, the ABC launched "Regional Connecting Communities" program, which provided funding for increased jobs in the regions, as well as more resources for local news, weather and live reporting.

Justin Stevens was appointed director of the division of ABC News, Analysis and Investigations on 31 March 2022.

Functions
The division is responsible for all news-gathering and production of news output for ABC television, the ABC network of radio stations, and for its online services. In 2018 it was estimated that online ABC news and current affairs reached about 4.8 million users in Australia each month. , the ABC News website includes ABC Sport, ABC Health, ABC Science, ABC Arts & Culture, ABC Fact Check, ABC Environment and news in other languages.

Theme music
The news theme used from the first days of ABC television from November 1956 to 1985 was "Majestic Fanfare", composed by Charles Williams. From 1956 until the early 1980s the version used was the abridged version performed by the Queen's Hall Light Orchestra, from a recording made in 1943. Each bulletin opened with a clip from the top story of the day, with the title "ABC News" superimposed over the footage. Later, this on-screen approach was replaced by a generic graphic title sequence. In 1982, to celebrate the ABC's 50th anniversary, a new version of the theme was commissioned, which incorporated both orchestral and new electronic elements.

With the exception of a period in the mid-1980s, during which a synthesised theme ("Best Endeavours", written by Alan Hawkshaw, which was  the theme for Channel 4 News in the UK) was used for around a year, this was used on radio until August 1988, and on television until early 1985. A reworking of "Majestic Fanfare" (essentially the original orchestration up one tone) was arranged by Richard Mills and recorded in 1988 by the Sydney Symphony Orchestra.

From 1985, a theme composed by Tony Ansell and Peter Wall was used for 20 years, even after the 1998 brand refresh. In 2010, it was sampled and remixed by the group Pendulum and this revised work went on to be placed #11 on the Triple J Hottest 100 chart on Australia Day 2011.

The theme for ABC News changed on Australia Day (26 January) 2005, to a piece written by Martin Armiger and John Gray, and for a couple of years it bore a resemblance to the original Peter Wall / Tony Ansell work in the opening signature notes. Wall challenged the ABC and was successful in reaching an agreement. The opening notes were removed and the work was re-arranged in 2010. The theme music from the 2005–2010 era was remixed by Armiger, giving it a more upbeat, synthesised feel.

Television

History
In 1985, the ABC refreshed its structure and look, when the 7 o'clock news and the following current affairs program (at that time, Nationwide) were combined to form The National, and moved to 6:30pm. After The National was deemed unsuccessful, that same year the news was refreshed again with a new set, graphics, and theme.

In 1998, the set was updated, a new opener featuring a light blue globe and the ABC logo was introduced, and the theme remained the same but was tweaked. The graphics also changed to match the new look.

In 2005, a new look (along with theme music) was introduced. The new look made use of an orange and blue globe motif. At the same time the set and graphics received a major overhaul to fit in with this look. This package was used until 21 July 2010, a day before the launch of ABC News.

In January 2010, the ABC announced that a dedicated 24-hour digital television news channel, named ABC News would be launched during the year. The new channel commenced preliminary broadcasting with a promo loop in early July 2010, with the ABC re-numbering ABC HD channel 20 to logical channel number 24. The  channel was officially launched as ABC News 24 at 7:30pm Australian Eastern Standard Time on 22 July 2010, and simulcast its first hour of transmission on ABC TV.

With the launch of ABC News on 22 July 2010, all 7pm bulletins across Australia had a graphics overhaul to match the look of the new channel. The blue/orange globe style opener was replaced with a series of sliding panels, featuring images specific to each state. New sets were built in each capital city studio to match the ABC News 24 set and graphics were changed to match.

ABC News channel 

The news bulletins such as ABC News Mornings, ABC News Afternoons, The World, and Weekend Breakfast are aired on ABC News along with its own 30- and 15-minute hourly bulletins.

National bulletins and programs

National news updates are presented on ABC TV throughout the day, with evening updates at 7pm presented live in most states by the respective state news presenters. Bulletins focus strongly on issues of state relevance, with a greater inclusion of national and international news items than are found in the news bulletins of commercial broadcasters. A national financial bulletin is presented on weeknights by Alan Kohler in Melbourne.  The ABC's Ultimo studios produces the 8:30pm weeknight update presented by Karina Carvalho.

News Breakfast is broadcast on weekdays from 6am – 9am on ABC TV and the ABC News channel from ABC's Melbourne studio and is presented by Michael Rowland and Lisa Millar, sport presenter Tony Armstrong and weather presenter Nate Byrne. The program is also shown online and on ABC Australia in the Asia Pacific region.

Weekend Breakfast is broadcast on weekends from 7am – 11am on ABC TV and the ABC News channel from ABC's main national news studio in Sydney at Ultimo and is presented by Johanna Nicholson and Fauziah Ibrahim.

ABC News Mornings is presented by Joe O'Brien from the ABC's main national news studio in Sydney at Ultimo, and airs weekdays at 9am on ABC TV and on the ABC News channel. Sport is presented by Tony Armstrong and weather is presented by Nate Byrne, both from the Melbourne studios.

ABC News at Noon (launched in February 2005 to replace the less successful Midday News and Business, preceded in turn by the long-running World at Noon) is presented by Ros Childs (weekdays) and Miriam Corowa (weekends) from the ABC's main national news studio in the Sydney suburb of Ultimo, and airs on ABC TV and ABC News channel in each Australian state and territory at midday Australian Eastern Standard/Daylight Time. A separate edition of the bulletin is produced for Western Australia two to three hours after the original broadcast, as the time delay was deemed too long to remain up-to-date.

7.30 is presented by Sarah Ferguson from the ABC's main national news studio in Ultimo, Sydney on ABC TV at 7:30pm, weeknights. However, when a big state political event happens, the national program can be pre-empted by the local edition.

ABC Late News is presented by Michael Tetlow from the ABC's Perth news studio on ABC TV at 10:30pm (eastern time), weeknights. A separate edition is presented from Perth for Western Australia also by Michael Tetlow on ABC at 10:30pm (western time) and then ABC News channel at midnight (eastern time) and 1:00am. Later, he also hosts 15-minute News Overnight bulletins.

Other news and current affairs programs broadcast nationally include Afternoon Briefing, ABC News at Five, 7.30, Insiders, Four Corners, Behind the News, Q&A, Landline, Offsiders, One Plus One, The Business, The Drum, The World, Australian Story, Foreign Correspondent, Media Watch and Australia Wide.

State bulletins

 ABC News Canberra is presented from the ABC's Dickson studio by James Glenday from Sunday to Thursday and Craig Allen on Friday and Saturday.
 ABC News New South Wales is presented from the ABC's Ultimo, New South Wales studio (ABN) by Juanita Phillips from Sunday to Thursday and Jeremy Fernandez on Friday and Saturday. Weather is presented by Tom Saunders on weeknights.
 ABC News Northern Territory is presented from the ABC's Darwin studio (ABD) by Jessica Randell from Sunday to Thursday and Melissa Mackay on Friday and Saturday.
 ABC News Queensland is presented from the ABC's Queensland headquarters (ABQ) on Brisbane's South Bank by Matt Wordsworth from Monday to Thursday and Jessica van Vonderen from Friday to Sunday. Weather is presented by Jenny Woodward from Sunday to Thursday.
 ABC News South Australia is presented from the ABC's Collinswood  studio (ABS) by Jessica Harmsen from Monday to Thursday and Emma Rebellato from Friday to Sunday. Weekend bulletins feature local sport bulletins presented by Alina Eacott.
 ABC News Tasmania is presented from the ABC's Hobart studio (ABT) by Guy Stayner on weeknights and Alexandra Alvaro on weekends.
 ABC News Victoria is presented from ABC Victoria's Southbank studio (ABV) by Tamara Oudyn from Sunday to Thursday and Mary Gearin on Friday and Saturday. Weather is presented by Paul Higgins on weeknights.
 ABC News Western Australia is presented from ABC WA's East Perth studio by Pamela Medlen from Monday to Thursday and Charlotte Hamlyn from Friday to Sunday. Tom Wildie presents sport on weekends, with weather being presented by Tyne Logan on weeknights.

ABC Australia

News and current affairs programs are also broadcast on ABC Australia, a channel broadcast to the region outside Australia. These include Four Corners, 7:30, Q+A and The Drum.

Online

ABC news television programs are available via the video-on-demand platform, ABC iview.

Radio

ABC NewsRadio is a radio station dedicated to news and current affairs.

ABC Radio Australia, which covers the Asia-Pacific region, broadcasts regular bulletins produced in Melbourne, featuring reports from foreign correspondents in the region.

National bulletins
ABC Classic FM broadcasts state bulletins every hour from 6am until noon and then every 2 hours on the hour.
Non-local streams of ABC Radio National broadcast national bulletins every hour, 24 hours a day.
National youth radio station triple j broadcasts its own bulletins between 6:00am and 6:00pm on weekdays, and between 7:00am and noon on weekends.

State bulletins
State bulletins are produced by the ABC Local Radio station from the capital city of each state and mainland territory. They are broadcast to all ABC Local Radio and ABC Radio National stations in each state, and focus strongly on issues of state relevance, but also feature national and international stories. National bulletins air when state bulletins are not produced.

ABC Local Radio stations broadcast a flagship 15-minute state bulletin at 7:45am, the only bulletin still introduced by the 18-second version of Majestic Fanfare. All other bulletins are introduced by a 9-second version of Majestic Fanfare. ABC Radio National and ABC Classic FM stations do not broadcast the 7:45am bulletin, instead broadcasting an ordinary 8:00am state bulletin and a 10-minute 7am bulletin respectively, and continue to broadcast bulletins every hour when Local Radio stations broadcast bulletins every 30 minutes in the early morning.

ABC News ACT is broadcast at 5:30am and on the hour between 6am and 10pm each day from the studios of ABC Radio Canberra.
ABC News New South Wales is broadcast at 5:30am and on the hour between 6am and 10pm each day from the studios of ABC Radio Sydney.
ABC News Northern Territory is broadcast at 5:30am and on the hour between 6am and 10pm each day from the studios of ABC Radio Darwin.
ABC News Queensland is broadcast at 5:30am and on the hour between 6am and 7pm on weekdays from the studios of ABC Radio Brisbane. Weekend bulletins are broadcast on the hour between 6am and midday.
ABC News South Australia is broadcast at 5:30am and on the hour between 6am and 10pm on weekdays from the studios of ABC Radio Adelaide. Weekend bulletins are broadcast on the hour between 6am and midday.
ABC News Tasmania is broadcast at 5:30am and on the hour between 6am and 9pm on weekdays from the studios of ABC Radio Hobart. Weekend bulletins are broadcast on the hour between 6am and midday.
ABC News Victoria is broadcast at 5:30am and on the hour between 6am and 10pm on weekdays from the studios of ABC Radio Melbourne. Weekend bulletins are broadcast on the hour between 6am and midday.
ABC News Western Australia is produced by ABC Radio Perth. Weekday bulletins are broadcast every 30 minutes between 5:00am and 7:00am, then at 7:45am, then at 9:00am, then every hour until 10:00pm. Weekend bulletins are broadcast every 30 minutes between 6:00am and 7:00am, then at 7:45am, then at 9:00am, then every hour until 1:00pm.

Current affairs
ABC News produces several current affairs programs for radio. All share a quasi-magazine format, and investigate stories in greater depth compared to news bulletins.

AM is broadcast in three editions — a 10-minute edition at 6:05am on ABC Local Radio, a 20-minute edition at 7:10am on ABC Radio National, and a flagship 30 minute edition at 8:00am on ABC Local Radio.
The World Today is broadcast in one edition — a 30-minute edition at 12:10pm on ABC Local Radio and ABC Radio National.
PM is broadcast in two editions — a 30-minute edition at 5:00pm on ABC Radio National, and a flagship 30 minute edition at 6:30pm on ABC Local Radio.

Programs
Other news-related, factual and current affairs programs broadcast by the various radio stations of the ABC Radio network include:
 Sunday Extra, incorporating Background Briefing and Ockham's Razor, hosted by Julian Morrow (replacing Correspondents Report),
RN Breakfast
Late Night Live
Hack
Nightlife
Awaye!
Country Breakfast

Online
All ABC radio stations are available via an ABC News mobile app, ABC Listen, from which podcasts are also available.

References

Further reading
 ABC Bureaux and Foreign Correspondents
 50 Years of ABC TV News and Current Affairs

External links

 
ABC News and Current Affairs
Australian Broadcasting Corporation divisions
Australian Broadcasting Corporation original programming
Australian television news shows
Australian news websites
Articles containing video clips